Halfway is a 2016 American drama film written and directed by Ben Caird and starring Quinton Aaron.  The film is Caird's directorial debut and Aaron served as an executive producer.  On November 1, 2017, 'Halfway' was nominated for a British Independent Film Award in the Discovery Award category.

Plot

Cast
Quinton Aaron as Byron
Jeffrey DeMunn as Walt
Marcus Henderson as Paulie
Gillian Zinser as Eliza
Amy Pietz as Beth
T.J. Power as Josh
Billy Aaron Brown as Sean

Production
According to Aaron, "We shot the movie over four weeks on the Lepeska family farm in Montfort, Wisconsin."  Aaron confirmed in another interview, "The writer and director, Ben Caird, his family farm is actually where we shot it at. Ben's British, but his mother is from Wisconsin, and their family farm was the farm we used in the movie in Montfort. So that's what brought us out here."  Early in development, Edi Gathegi was to have portrayed Paulie.

Release
Halfway made its worldwide premiere on April 20, 2016 at the Dallas International Film Festival.  On June 12, 2016, it was announced that the worldwide sales rights to Halfway have been acquired by the Film Sales Company.

A screening of the film was shown at the 16th Wildwood Film Festival in Appleton, Wisconsin on March 10, 2017.

The film made its exclusive premiere on the Urban Movie Channel on April 21, 2017.

References

External links
 
 

2016 directorial debut films
2016 films
American drama films
Films shot in Wisconsin
2010s English-language films
2010s American films
2016 drama films